"Tokyo Girl (Club Mix Version)" is the 28th single by Japanese singer Yōko Oginome. Written by Takashi Matsumoto and Kenji Hayashida, the single was released on June 23, 1993, by Victor Entertainment.

Background and release
The song is a remix of "Tokyo Girl", which was used as the insert song of the NHK drama special , which starred Oginome. The original version was not released until 2010, when it was included as a bonus track in the re-release of Oginome's 1993 album De-Luxe.

"Tokyo Girl (Club Mix Version)" peaked at No. 66 on Oricon's singles chart and sold over 10,000 copies.

Track listing

Charts

References

External links

1993 singles
Yōko Oginome songs
Japanese-language songs
Victor Entertainment singles